Amaryllis Night and Day is a 2001 novel by Russell Hoban, incorporating elements of magic realism and romance.

Plot introduction
Peter Diggs has a vivid dream in which he meets a woman called Amaryllis. When he later encounters the same woman in real life, he discovers that the two of them have the ability to enter each other's dreams. A cautious relationship is begun, half in the real world and half in dreams, in which both parties struggle to overcome the emotional effects of previous failed romances.

Characters
Peter Diggs, the narrator of the novel, an artist in his early thirties
Amaryllis, who has the power to ‘tune in’ to people's dreams
Lenore, Peter's former girlfriend, an artist with emotional problems
Ron Hastings, a student of Peter's who appears in his dreams and who may also know Amaryllis

Major themes
The novel is by turns romantic, philosophical, funny, sexy, and frightening, as the characters explore the different possibilities offered by their unique talent. Both Peter and Amaryllis have been involved in failed relationships before – exactly how many and how disastrously we only find out gradually – and they are haunted by the danger of repeating their past mistakes.

Hoban's writing builds up a series of metaphors throughout the book so that, as in a dream, many things take on unusual significance, or seem to represent something else. The idea of the dream itself seems to function for Hoban as a symbol of the way in which elements from the past come back to affect the present day, and in the characters' dreams various significant people and objects from real life appear in exaggerated forms, not all of which are fully explained. The names, too, are full of meaning: Amaryllis is linked to the botanical genus of Amaryllis, related to deadly nightshade, and Lenore is explicitly linked with her namesake in Edgar Allan Poe's poem "The Raven."

The hypothetical object known as a Klein bottle plays an important role in the book after Peter visits the London Science Museum. Klein bottles are four-dimensional one-sided bodies which can only exist in three-dimensional space by intersecting with themselves. This concept is built up in the book as a metaphor for the way people cross and re-cross important physical and emotional points in their lives.

Peter is a painter and Amaryllis a musician, and there is a lot of reflection in the book about art's ability to reflect and enrich a person's emotional life. A great many other artists are referenced during the book (see below). Early in the novel, Peter mentions a review of his paintings which comments on the ‘odd empty spaces’ in his work. Peter muses:

Allusions/references to other works
Many other writers and musicians are mentioned or quoted in the novel, including:
 Nelson Algren's A Walk on the Wild Side
The Tom Waits song Walking Spanish
 Edward Hopper's painting Gas (which the characters enter during a dream)
The Sleeping Beauty fairytale
 Brer Rabbit
The Negro spiritual There is a Balm in Gilead
 Milton's Lycidas (which includes the line ‘to sport with Amaryllis in the shade’)
The film Dreamscape
The prisons etchings of Piranesi
 Thornton Wilder's The Bridge of San Luis Rey
 Georg Christoph Lichtenberg
The self-help ‘life coach’ Anthony Robbins
 Barbara Strozzi
The 1930s song "Life Is Just a Bowl of Cherries"
 Oliver Onions's story "The Beckoning Fair One"
 Walter de la Mare's poem ‘Fare Well’
 Melville's Moby-Dick

Adaptations
According to fansites, the book has been optioned by Doppelganger Films.

Release details
2001, UK, Bloomsbury , trade paperback

External links
 Description at The Head of Orpheus fansite
 Guardian review

2001 British novels
Novels by Russell Hoban
2001 speculative fiction novels
British romance novels
British magic realism novels
Bloomsbury Publishing books